Antonio Mariani was an Italian luthier in the 17th century. He is believed to have studied in Brescia under Giovanni Paolo Maggini, and was later mostly active in Pesaro from 1635 to 1695.

A simple design and plain materials such as pine are typical for his violins, which are renowned for their excellent tone.

His violins have amongst others been played by the violists Lionel Tertis and Barbara Buntrock.

References

Italian luthiers
17th-century Italian businesspeople
Place of birth unknown